The 2012 Salford City Council election took place on 3 May 2012 to elect members of Salford City Council in England. One third of the council was up for election with councillors elected in 2008 Salford Council election defending their seats. Vote shares are calculated against the previous election to the corresponding seat. There was also an election for mayor, and other local elections on the same date.

The composition of the Council following the 2012 elections is:

Ward results
Asterisks denote incumbent Councillors seeking re-election.
Vote share changes compared with corresponding 2008 election.

Barton ward

Boothstown & Ellenbrook ward

Broughton ward

Cadishead ward

Claremont ward

Eccles ward

Irlam ward

Irwell Riverside ward

Kersal ward

Langworthy ward

Little Hulton ward

Ordsall ward

Pendlebury ward

Swinton North ward

Swinton South ward

Walkden North ward

Walkden South ward

Weaste & Seedley ward

Winton ward

Worsley ward

References

2012
2012 English local elections
2010s in Greater Manchester